Sasha Berliner (born June 20, 1998) is an American vibraphonist and composer.

Early life  

Berliner was born in San Francisco and grew up in the Bay Area, where she began playing drums at age 8. In her earlier years, Berliner was more focused on rock and indie music, and she participated in the San Francisco Rock Project (formerly the San Francisco School of Rock) along with her entire family: her father, John Berliner, is a bassist on the school's board of directors; her mother, Sheri Evans, was the school office manager; and Berliner and her brother, Cole, played in the school's House Band for a number of years.

In 2011, at the age of 13, Berliner auditioned for the Oakland School for the Arts, but was told they already had too many drummers. The school asked if she would be interested in playing the vibraphone instead, and she agreed without knowing what instrument it was. Despite her initial confusion, she found the vibraphone spoke to her investments in harmony and melody, and she quickly became invested in pursuing it professionally, choosing the school's jazz track. As a teenager, she continued working in a number of genres as a singer and multi-instrumentalist, and in 2013 arranged a version of Beck's "Please Leave a Light On When You Go" from the Song Reader for the San Francisco Rock Project; she also ran a fashion blog, in part inspired by her mother's work running a boutique in San Francisco.

Education and career 

Berliner joined the SFJAZZ High School All-Stars as a junior, and recorded her EP Gold at age 16. She graduated from high school in 2016 and moved to New York City to attend The New School for Jazz and Contemporary Music.

In 2017, she attended the Banff International Workshop in Jazz and Creative Music, then led by composers Vijay Iyer and Tyshawn Sorey; Sorey invited Berliner to join his newest sextet the following year.

Berliner says the higher-than-usual number of women musicians at Banff and the women faculty's increased transparency about harassment inspired her to speak out about gender-based mistreatment. Shortly after returning from the workshop, in late September of 2017, she published an open letter on her experiences and observations of sexism in the jazz community. The letter began spreading rapidly just a few weeks before the #MeToo hashtag went viral, leading to heightened media attention to issues of workplace harassment and assault.

Then a 19-year-old college sophomore, Berliner was invited to perform as "one of the youngest bandleaders" at the 2018 NYC Winter Jazzfest, and in the following months, her letter received wide coverage in publications including The New York Times Hot House Jazz Magazine, and PBS NewsHour. SFJAZZ Magazine named her one of "10 Rising Women Instrumentalists You Should Know", ARTS ATL said the letter had "made her one of the most talked-about jazz musicians associated with the #MeToo movement", and in September 2018, she was on the cover of Tom Tom Magazine, the subject of a feature titled "Activist Vibes".

In January 2019, she was announced as the LetterOne "Rising Stars" Jazz Award's North American recipient for 2018; the prize was a seven-city tour of North America, including dates at jazz festivals in Canada and the United States. Later in 2019, she signed as an artist with Vater Percussion and Marimba One and released her first full-length record, Azalea.

Berliner has played with artists including Nicholas Payton, Quincy Davis, and Warren Wolf, as well as solo and in her own groups. She was named in DownBeats Critics Poll in 2020 (as "Rising Star" vibraphonist) and 2022, and the DownBeat Readers Poll for 2019, 2020, 2021, and 2022. 

She released her second full-length, Onyx, in 2022.

Discography

As leader

As side person

References

External links 
 

1998 births
Musicians from San Francisco
Living people
American jazz vibraphonists
Women jazz musicians
American jazz percussionists
American jazz composers
21st-century American musicians
Jazz musicians from California